William Clintard Robinzine (January 20, 1953 – September 16, 1982) was an American professional basketball player.

Born in Chicago, Robinzine grew to be a 6' 7" forward from DePaul University. He played seven seasons (1975–1982) in the NBA, competing for the Kansas City Kings, Cleveland Cavaliers, Dallas Mavericks, and Utah Jazz. He is perhaps best remembered for his inclusion in the highlight footage of Darryl Dawkins' backboard-shattering dunk at Kansas City's Kemper Arena on November 13, 1979. Robinzine, who was under the basket at the time, fled while shielding his face in order to avoid falling glass, which inspired Dawkins to include the phrase "Robinzine Cryin'" when later creating a name for the dunk.

NBA player profile
Robinzine was known as a tough rebounder and one of the better defensive players in the league at the power forward position.  He played for the Kings for five seasons often averaging double digits in scoring, and then was released to make room for Reggie King.  After playing in a diminished role in Cleveland, Robinzine got a rejuvenated career with the Dallas Mavericks.  In Dallas, Robinzine became one of the leading scorers along with Jim Spanarkel.  He signed with the Utah Jazz for the 1981-82 season, where his role had diminished and he fell out of Utah's rotation.  Jazz general manager Frank Layden had told Robinzine that if he were to offer him a contract it would be for less money, and Robinzine had already rejected small offers to player overseas.

Death
In September 1982, Robinzine committed suicide in his car by carbon monoxide poisoning at a storage place in Kansas City, Missouri. Robinzine, though on the outside seeming very optimistic, was not on any NBA team's roster at that time and had been distraught over not getting any new contract offers after what he felt was a year in Utah where his playing time had diminished.  His wife, Claudia, had said that he "couldn't reconcile not being in the NBA anymore."  He was also upset over financial problems that close friends as well as financial advisors had all told him were extremely manageable, despite what he had thought.

See also
List of basketball players who died during their careers

References

External links
Career stats @ basketball-reference.com
"Robinzine Found Dead" @ query.nytimes.com
"THE MYSTERY OF THE LIFE AND DEATH OF AN ATHLETE" @ nytimes.com

1953 births
1982 suicides
African-American basketball players
American men's basketball players
Cleveland Cavaliers players
Dallas Mavericks players
DePaul Blue Demons men's basketball players
Kansas City Kings draft picks
Kansas City Kings players
Power forwards (basketball)
Suicides by carbon monoxide poisoning
Suicides in Missouri
Utah Jazz players
Basketball players from Chicago
20th-century African-American sportspeople